The Corrèze is a 95 km long river in south-western France, left tributary of the river Vézère. Its source is in the north-western Massif Central. It flows south-west through the Corrèze département (named after the river) and the cities Tulle and Brive-la-Gaillarde. A few km downstream from Brive-la-Gaillarde, the Corrèze flows into the Vézère.

References

Rivers of France
Rivers of Corrèze
Rivers of Nouvelle-Aquitaine